Sarajevo List (in Swedish: Sarajevolistan) was a political project in Sweden launched ahead of the 1995 European Parliament elections. The group contested the elections, with the intention of "giving a voice to Bosnia" in the European Parliament. The Sarajevo List urged Western countries to intervene in favour of the Bosnian Muslims in the ongoing Bosnian War.

Leading figures of the Sarajevo List were Wilhelm Agrell, Bibi Andersson, Jesús Alcalá and Maciej Zaremba.

In the elections the Sarajevo List got 26,875 votes (1%), but failed to win any seats.

Political parties established in 1995
Defunct political parties in Sweden
Single-issue political parties